The Société Angéliqué was a group of writers and other scholars which formed around the printer/publisher Sebastian Gryphius in Lyon in the mid 16th century during the "Lyon Renaissance". It is considered to be the antecedent of the more recent literary societies. According to the cryptographer Claude Sosthène Grasset d'Orcet the group employed masonic trappings and adopted an angel's head as their crest.

The Société Angéliqué is purported, by Michel Lamy, to be the secret society behind many esoteric phenomena and movements including the mystery of Rennes-le-Château, the Priory of Sion, and the Thule Society. Lamy indicated that he based his extrapolations about the society on previous work by Grasset d'Orcet. According to Lamy, the society's traditions were disseminated in cryptic form, and he postulated that its membership included all the usual conspiracy theory favourites: Leonardo da Vinci, Alexandre Dumas, père, Guercino, Nicolas Poussin, Dante Alighieri, Johann Wolfgang von Goethe, Jules Verne and others.

See also

 Secret society

References

Secret societies in France